Edna Kamala Yeromani (born 3 January 1946 – died 14 March 2018 as එඩ්නා සුගතපාල) [Sinhala]), popularly as Edna Sugathapala, was an actress in Sri Lankan cinema, theater and television. She is also a pianist, vocalist and astrologer. She is the only artiste in the Sri Lankan cinema who worked as a professional astrologer. She is best known for the roles in films Miringuwa, Senehasa and Tharanaya.

She died on 14 March 2018 while receiving treatments at Colombo Nawaloka Hospital. According to her wish, the body was handed over to a Medical College.

Personal life
She was born on 3 January 1946 at Gorakana, Panadura. She completed her education from Good Shepherd Convent, Colombo and then from Holy Family Convent, Bambalapitiya. Her mother Swarna Mary Bernadeth was a film producer. Edna married on 28 February 1973. She has one daughter, Veena.

Career
At very small age, Sugathapala acted with Late Rukmani Devi for the song Doy Doyya Putha in the film Daiwayogaya. She started his acting career through the play Gehenu Hatana produced by Dick Dias in 1966. Apart from acting, she played piano and accordion in the playback music for films Surayangeth Suraya and Me Desa Kumatada.

She started musical career at the age of 6. She graduated from Trinity College London examinations in piano. In 1978, Sugathapala released her first music album Veena. The songs were written by Karunaratne Abeysekera and music directed by Mohamed Sally. She also involved for duets sang with H.R. Jothipala. Sugathapala holds the record by being the only Sri Lankan actress to play as a professional musician in a musical orchestra in a film. Her maiden cinematic experience came through 1966 film Senasuma Kothanada directed by K.A.W. Perera with a dance in song Sulan Kurullo.

On 14 March 2015, she celebrated 50 years of artistic career by releasing CD with instrumental music titled Veena. The ceremony was held at Mahaweli Centre, Colombo. Sugathapala wrote a book Sugatha Chintha. In 2019, she returns to cinema after a break of a decade with the film Iskoleta Man Awa.

She also acted in few television serials such as Sakura Mal, Makara Vijithaya, Rankira Soya  and Kindurangana.

Filmography

References

External links
 Some goodbyes are for remembering

Sri Lankan film actresses
1946 births
2018 deaths